Eutemnospondyli (meaning "true Temnospondyli") is a clade of temnospondyl amphibians that includes most temnospondyls except edopoids. Eutemnospondyli was named by German paleontologist Rainer R. Schoch in 2013. He defined it as a stem-based taxon including all temnospondyls more closely related to Stereospondyli than to Edopoidea. In his phylogenetic analysis, Eutemnospondyli included dendrerpetontids and a clade he referred to as Rhachitomi. Rhachitomi is defined to include four major and well-supported clades of temnospondyls: Dvinosauria, Eryopidae, Stereospondyli and a clade formed by Zatracheidae and Dissorophoidea. Below is a cladogram from Schoch's analysis:

References

 
Carboniferous temnospondyls
Permian temnospondyls
Triassic temnospondyls
Jurassic temnospondyls
Cretaceous temnospondyls